Edgewater is an unincorporated community located in the town of Edgewater, Sawyer County, Wisconsin, United States. Edgewater had a post office, which closed on October 21, 1995.

References

Unincorporated communities in Sawyer County, Wisconsin
Unincorporated communities in Wisconsin